Chinchani is a Census Town in the Dahanu Taluka of Palghar District of Maharashtra, India.

Geography 
It has an average elevation of 9 metres (29 feet). It is well connected by roads and nearby railway station. Also it is the important center of education and commercial activities in the region. Chinchani has a beach on the west coast. There is a place in the province of Ayacucho, Peru with the same name, located on the other side of the globe at latitude. -14.390833300000001°, longitude. -73.878333299999994°. 

Vangaon railway station serves as a primary railway station around 8 km away. Boisar railway station is around 10 km, while Dahanu Road railway station is around 15 km from the town. Basically, a twin town of Chinchani-Tarapur which are separated geographical by border of Dahanu & Palghar talukas, where Chinchani come under Dahanu taluka & Tarapur in Palghar. Thus it enjoys good road connectivity with both the big towns as well as Boisar.Regular ST buses (state transport) & also Auto rickshaws ply to this nearby big towns.

Demographics 
 India census, Chinchani had a population of around 13,435. Males constitute 51% of the population and females 49%. Chinchani has an average literacy rate of 79%, higher than the national average of 59.5%; with male literacy of 83% and female literacy of 75%. 11% of the population is under 6 years of age.

Among minority languages, Gujarati is spoken by 26.80% of the population.

References 

P.l.shroff college near the chinchani beach

Cities and towns in Palghar district